Grabno  is a village in the administrative district of Gmina Sędziejowice, within Łask County, Łódź Voivodeship, in central Poland. Its climate is very humid all year long.

References

Villages in Łask County